Amber is the third album by indie rock group Clearlake, released on January 23, 2006 on Domino Records. The seventh track from the album, "Finally Free", was featured on Eden Games'  2006 videogame release, Test Drive Unlimited. The song "No Kind of Life" appeared in the movie Awake.

Track listing

References

2006 albums
Clearlake (band) albums
Domino Recording Company albums
Albums produced by Jim Abbiss